St. James' School, Kolkata, India, is a CNI school, and is one of the oldest private schools in India. It was founded on the 25th of July in 1864 by Bishop Cotton, and celebrated its sesquicentenary (150 years) in July 2014. It is an all boys school  and is associated with the ICSE and ISC Board of Education.

The school has four houses which are Cotton, Copleston, Lefroy, and Westcott, each named after an English Bishop who served in India in the 19th century.

In 1900, St. James' School won the Beighton Cup.

Notable alumni 

Somnath Bharadwaj - Batch 1983 - Astro Physicist IIT Kharagpur
Rajesh Gopakumar - Batch 1987 - Theoretical Physicist and Director of the ICTS
Sanjeev Sanyal - Batch 1989 - Principal Economic Advisor to Ministry of Finance, Government of India and Environmentalist.
Pritam - Batch 1990 - Bollywood Music Director.
Arjun Atwal - Batch 1992 - Pro Golfer, member of PGA.
Debashish Chaudhuri - Batch 1995 -  Indian Symphonic Conductor of Western Classical Music
Murtaza Lodhgar - Batch 1995 - Ranji Trophy Cricketer and Coach for Bengal.
Sujoy Ghosh - Till Std IV - Filmmaker, National Award Winner.
Rohit K. Dasgupta, Academic and UK Politician (Labour Party) 
Ashish Dhawan, Private Equity Investor

References

External links
 Official website

Church of North India schools
Schools in Colonial India
Christian schools in West Bengal
Private schools in Kolkata
Educational institutions established in 1864
1864 establishments in India